Ajaysinh Chauhan is a Gujarati writer and critic from Gujarat, India. He is a registrar of the Gujarat Sahitya Akademi and an editor of its organ, Shabdasrishti.

Life
He was born on 25 September 1983. He completed Bachelor of Arts in 2003, Master of Arts in 2005, and M.Phil. in 2006 from the Sardar Patel University. He obtained PhD from the same university in 2013 under Manilal H. Patel; for his research work Adhunikottar Gujarati Kavita (Postmodern Gujarati poetry).

He served as the Senate Member of Faculty of Arts and as the Member of Gujarati Board of Studies at Sardar Patel University. He was a member of Governing Body of Gujarati Sahitya Parishad from 2013 to 2017. Since 2018, he serves as a registrar of Gujarat Sahitya Akademi.

Works
He published his Ph. D. thesis, Adhunikottar Gujarati Kavita, as a book in 2013. He edited Amritlal Vegadnu Pravas Sahitya, Sarvatraramya Narmada, Gaam Javani Hath Chhodi De (poems of Manilal H. Patel) and Kalavithi.

Awards
He was awarded the Ramanlal Joshi Vivechan Paritoshik by Gujarati Sahitya Parishad in 2013 for his work Adhunikottar Gujarati Kavita. He was awarded by the Gujarat Sahitya Akademi in 2013 for the same work. Gujarat Sahitya Akademi awarded him the Yuva Gaurav Puraskar in 2016 for his contribution in the Gujarati literature.

See also
 List of Gujarati-language writers

References

External links

1983 births
Living people
Gujarati-language writers
21st-century male writers
Indian literary critics